Klos is a village and a former municipality in Elbasan County, central Albania. At the 2015 local government reform it became a subdivision of the municipality Cërrik. The population at the 2011 census was 3,262. The municipality consists of the villages Klos, Selvias, Qyrkan, Lumas, Qafë, Floq, Trunç and Banjë.

References

Administrative units of Cërrik
Former municipalities in Elbasan County
Villages in Elbasan County